Fernando Gabriel Vougado Ribeiro (born 11 May 1988) is a Brazilian footballer who plays for Emarati side Al Hamriyah as a attacking midfielder.

Career
In August 2014, Fernando Gabriel moved from Paraná Clube to Azerbaijan Premier League side FK Khazar Lankaran, leaving the club in December of the same year.

Persepolis
He signed with Iran Pro League side Persepolis in January 2015. Gabriel missed a penalty kick on his debut in a 1–0 loss to Malavan. On 24 February 2015 Gabriel assisted Mohsen Bengar's goal in Persepolis' 3–0 win over Lekhwiya in the AFC Champions League.

Hajer
On 6 August 2021, Gabriel joined Hajer.

Al Hamriyah
On 6 August 2022, Gabriel joined UAE First Division League side Al Hamriyah.

Career statistics

Honours 
Paysandu
 Campeonato Paraense: 2017

References

External links

Brazilian FA Database 
 

1988 births
Living people
Footballers from São Paulo (state)
Brazilian footballers
Brazilian expatriate footballers
Khazar Lankaran FK players
Al-Faisaly FC players
Expatriate footballers in Azerbaijan
Brazilian expatriate sportspeople in Azerbaijan
Expatriate footballers in the United Arab Emirates
Brazilian expatriate sportspeople in the United Arab Emirates
Persepolis F.C. players
Araguaína Futebol e Regatas players
Hatta Club players
Fujairah FC players
Al-Adalah FC players
Hajer FC players
Al Hamriyah Club players
Saudi Professional League players
UAE Pro League players
Saudi First Division League players
UAE First Division League players
Association football midfielders